Latino Greek-letter organizations, in the North American student fraternity and sorority system, refer to general or social organizations oriented to students having a special interest in Latino culture and identity. The first known Latino fraternal organization was Alpha Zeta fraternity, established in 1889 at Cornell University. The current rise in Latino Greek organizations began in 1975 and is known as the Latino Greek Movement. This movement called for the equality of Latino people in America, and many Greek0letter organizations were developed to create solidarity and political empowerment for the Latino community. There are currently more than 45 Latin-oriented fraternities and sororities, sixteen of which are members of the National Association of Latino Fraternal Organizations.

National Association of Latino Fraternal Organizations

The National Association of Latino Fraternal Organizations (NALFO) is an umbrella council for sixteen Latino Greek-letter organizations.

North-American Interfraternity Conference

Six fraternities are affiliated with the North American Interfraternity Conference.

Concilio Interfraternitario de Puerto Rico
Five Puerto Rican fraternities and two sororities compose the Concilio Interfraternitario de Puerto Rico (Puerto Rican Interfraternity Council). The five fraternities are also members of the Concilio Interfraternitario Puertorriqueño de la Florida (Puerto Rican Interfraternity Council in Florida).

Independent
The organizations listed here are not affiliated with a national umbrella council.

Afro-Latino organizations
Five fraternities and two sororities define themselves as Afro-Latino organizations.

Defunct organizations
Fifteen organizations are no longer in existence.

Notes

See also 

Christian fraternity / Christian sorority
Cultural interest fraternities and sororities
Fraternities and sororities in Canada
Fraternities and sororities in North America
List of African-American Greek and fraternal organizations
List of fraternities and sororities in France
List of fraternities and sororities in Puerto Rico
List of fraternities and sororities in the Philippines
List of social fraternities and sororities
Professional fraternities and sororities
Service fraternities and sororities
Racism in Greek life

References

Fraternities and sororities

Lists of organizations
Lists of organizations based in the United States
Lists of student societies
Student societies in the United States